Excel Dryer is an American manufacturer of hand dryers, based in East Longmeadow, Massachusetts.

History 
In the mid 1960s, they created their first hand dryer from Excel. This hand dryer was Model S/RS and was stainless steel, later it became available in White and Chrome.

In 1989, Excel Dryer released a Hands-Off model called HO-IL, HO-IW, and HO-IC for surface mounted and a year later, R76-IW, and R76-IC for recessed mounted.

In 1997, Denis Gagnon bought the company. The company hired 3 former Rocket Scientists including Sol Aisenberg, George Freedman, and Richard Pavelle. In 2001, their first high speed hand dryer, Xlerator, was produced.  In 2022, the company claims it dries hands in 8 seconds.

Excel Dryer's products have been approved for LEED v4 credits and other green building standards.

In 2015, Excel Dryer released a different hand dryer model called a ThinAir (TA-SB, or TA-ABS) and the Xlerator was modified with the New Controllers.

In 2018, Excel Dryer released a hand dryer that can be installed on top of a sink called XLERATORsync.

References

Manufacturing companies based in Massachusetts
Manufacturing companies established in 1963
1963 establishments in Massachusetts
Companies based in Hampden County, Massachusetts
Sanitation companies